Paidia elegantia is a moth of the family Erebidae. It was described by Josef J. de Freina and Thomas Joseph Witt in 2004. It is found in southern Iran.

References

Nudariina
Moths described in 2004